Zheng Kezang (1662–1681), birth name Qin or Qinshe, was the crown prince and regency of Kingdom of Tungning. Kezhang was the eldest son of Zheng Jing and Chen Zhaoniang, and his grandparents were Koxinga and Princess Dong.

Biography 

In 1662, Zheng was born in Xiamen; his mother was Chen Zhaoniang, who was one of the concubines of Zheng Jing. In 1679, Zheng became Jianguo Shisun, the crown prince and regency of Tungning.

In 1681, after Zheng Jing died, Kezang was killed by his uncle Zheng Cong in the "Tungning Coup".

Princess Chen, Zheng's princess consort, committed suicide later. Zheng did not have any children.

Family 

Siblings:
 Zheng Keshuang
 Zheng Kexue

References 

House of Koxinga
Kingdom of Tungning
17th-century monarchs in Asia
Taiwanese people of Tungning
1662 births
1681 deaths
1670s in Taiwan
1680s in Taiwan
Taiwanese politicians
Politicians from Xiamen
Taiwanese politicians of Japanese descent
Chinese politicians of Japanese descent